Euthalia (from Ancient Greek: Euthalia Ευθαλια "flower", "bloom") is a genus of brush-footed butterflies. They are commonly called barons or (like some relatives in Bassarona and Dophla) dukes.

Species
Listed alphabetically:
 Euthalia aconthea Cramer, 1777 – common baron or baron
 Euthalia adonia Cramer, 1780
 Euthalia agnis Vollenhoven, 1862
 Euthalia alpheda Godart, 1824 – streaked baron
 Euthalia alpherakyi Oberthür, 1907
 Euthalia amabilis Staudinger, 1896
 Euthalia amanda Hewitson, 1861 – Sulawesi gaudy baron
 Euthalia anosia Moore, 1858 – grey baron
 Euthalia apex  Tsukada, 1991 
 Euthalia aristides Oberthür, 1907
 Euthalia bunzoi Sugiyama, 1996
 Euthalia confucius Westwood, 1850
 Euthalia curvifascia Tytler, 1915
 Euthalia djata Distant & Pryer, 1887
 Euthalia duda Staudinger, 1855 – blue duchess
 Euthalia durga Moore, 1858 – blue duke (often placed in Bassarona)
 Euthalia eriphylae de Nicéville, 1891
 Euthalia formosana Fruhstorfer, 1908
 Euthalia franciae Gray, 1846 – French duke
 Euthalia guangdongensis Wu, 1994
 Euthalia hebe Fruhstorfer, 1908
 Euthalia heweni Huang, 2002
 Euthalia hoa  Monastyrskii, 2005  Vietnam, China
 Euthalia insulae Hall, 1930
 Euthalia iapis
 Euthalia ipona Fruhstorfer, 1913
 Euthalia irrubescens Grose-Smith, 1893
 Euthalia kanda Moore, 1859
 Euthalia kardama Moore, 1859
 Euthalia kameii Koiwava, 1996
 Euthalia khama Alphéraky, 1895 – Naga duke
 Euthalia khambounei Uehara & Yokochi, 2001
 Euthalia koharai Yokochi, 2005
 Euthalia kosempona Fruhstorfer, 1908
 Euthalia linpingensis Mell, 1935
 Euthalia lubentina Cramer, 1777 – gaudy baron
 Euthalia lusiada 9C. & R. Felder, 1863
 Euthalia masumi  Yokochi, 2009 China, Guangxi
 Euthalia pacifica Mell, 1934
 Euthalia pulchella Lee, 1979
 Euthalia mahadeva Moore, 1859
 Euthalia malaccana Fruhstorfer, 1899 – Fruhstorfer's baron
 Euthalia malapana Shirozu & Chung, 1958
 Euthalia merta Moore, 1859 – white-tipped baron
 Euthalia mingyiae Huang, 2002
 Euthalia monina Fabricius, 1787 – powdered baron
 Euthalia nais Forster, 1771 – baronet
 Euthalia nara Moore, 1859 – bronze duke
 Euthalia niepelti Strand, 1916
 Euthalia omeia Leech, 1891
 Euthalia patala Kollar, 1844 – grand duchess
 Euthalia perlella Chou & Wang, 1994
 Euthalia phemius Doubleday, 1848 – white-edged blue baron
 Euthalia pratti Leech, 1891
 Euthalia purchella Lee, 1979
 Euthalia pyrrha Leech, 1892
 Euthalia sahadeva Moore, 1859 – green duke
 ?Euthalia staudingeri Leech, 1891
 Euthalia strephon Grose-Smith, 1893
 Euthalia suprema Uehara & Yokochi, 2001
 Euthalia tanagra Staudinger, 1889
 Euthalia telchinia Ménétriés, 1857 – blue baron
 Euthalia tinna Fruhstorfer, 1906
 Euthalia thibetana Poujade, 1885
 Euthalia tsangpoi Huang, 1999
 Euthalia undosa Fruhstorfer, 1906
 Euthalia whiteheadi Grose-Smith, 1889
 Euthalia yasuyukii Yoshino, 1998

The common earl, now in Tanaecia, was formerly placed in Euthalia.

References

External links
Images representing Euthalia at Encyclopedia of Life

 
Nymphalidae genera
Limenitidinae
Taxa named by Jacob Hübner